Tony Ewerton Ramos da Silva (born 4 August 1989), or simply Tony, is a Brazilian professional footballer who plays as a right back for Paysandu.

Career
Born in Maraial, Pernambuco, Tony made his senior debuts with CRB, in 2009. After a short period with Sport Recife's youth setup he returned to senior football, signing with Juventus-SP.

On 15 May 2012 Tony signed with Grêmio, and made his Campeonato Brasileiro Série A debut on 17 June, playing the last 15 minutes of a 0–1 away loss against Náutico. On 6 June of the following year he was loaned to Criciúma, and scored his first top flight goal with Tigre, but in a 1–2 away loss against Santos.

On 17 January 2014 Tony was loaned to Portuguesa. After appearing rarely he moved to Santa Cruz on 23 May.

Career statistics

References

External links
Tony at playmakerstats.com (English version of ogol.com.br)

1989 births
Living people
Brazilian footballers
Association football defenders
Campeonato Brasileiro Série A players
Campeonato Brasileiro Série B players
Clube de Regatas Brasil players
Clube Atlético Juventus players
Grêmio Foot-Ball Porto Alegrense players
Criciúma Esporte Clube players
Associação Portuguesa de Desportos players
Santa Cruz Futebol Clube players
Esporte Clube Bahia players
Mirassol Futebol Clube players
Goiás Esporte Clube players
Grêmio Novorizontino players
Associação Atlética Ponte Preta players
Esporte Clube São Bento players
Oeste Futebol Clube players
Paysandu Sport Club players